The 1861 Mendoza earthquake occurred in the province of Mendoza, Argentina on 20 March at 11:30 PM. It had an estimated magnitude of 7.2 on the  scale and an intensity of IX–X on the Mercalli scale.

Tectonic setting
The city of Mendoza lies just to the east of the Precordillera structural belt, at the eastern margin of the Andes mountain belt. The ongoing flat slab subduction of the Nazca Plate below the South American Plate is causing shortening in the over-riding plate that is concentrated in the Precordillera belt, with a rate of 4.5±1.7 mm per year, from GPS data. This shortening is expressed as active thrust faulting. The two active thrust faults near Mendoza are the Peñas Thrust and the Cal Thrust, with the latter reaching the surface inside the city. This zone is one of the most seismically active parts of the Andes.

Earthquake
The earthquake is thought to have been caused by rupture of the Cal Thrust. The estimated magnitude of 7.2  is consistent with the estimated slip rate and frequency of ruptures along this fault, which suggest vertical offsets in the range 0.8–1.0 m for the last three to four earthquakes.

Damage
The earthquake devastated the provincial capital, Mendoza, killing somewhere in the range of 6,000 to 12,000 people, although even higher numbers have been suggested,  with thousands more being injured.  with thousands more being injured. Most of the buildings were destroyed, including the cabildo (colonial government house). Fires caused by rupturing of the gas supply for lighting in some stores lasted for four days. The obstruction of canals led to local flooding. The effects of liquefaction were widely reported and many large landslides were observed.

The town was rebuilt in a nearby location, and the authorities moved to their new seat in 1863. The new constructions, which incorporated modern architectural styles, were markedly different from the old colonial buildings.

Notable deaths 
 Auguste Bravard

See also
List of earthquakes in Argentina
List of historical earthquakes

References

  Epicentro de los terremotos destructivos en Argentina (1692–2012) Listado de Terremotos Históricos.

Further reading

1861
Mendoza, Argentina
Mendoza, 1861
1861 in Argentina
March 1861 events
1861 disasters in Argentina